Manuel de Portillo y Urrisola, also known as Manuel de Portillo y Urrizola, was a judge who served as the acting Spanish colonial governor of Santa Fe de Nuevo México province (present day New Mexico) from 1760 to 1762, located in the northern Viceroyalty of New Spain (colonial México).

Biography
Portillo y Urrizola served as a judge in New Mexico during a certain period of time. So, he worked as judge for Francisco Antonio Marín del Valle, another governor of New Mexico.

Portillo y Urrizola was appointed Acting Governor of Santa Fe de Nuevo México on May 10, 1760,
replacing Mateo Antonio de Mendoza. In 1761, the Apaches violently attacked the Pueblo of Taos, New Mexico. To punish them for that, Portillo y Urrizola sent a military campaign against the Apaches, which ended with the murder of 400 people of this ethnicity. Moreover, Urrisola repressed to a group of Comanches who were trading with  Taos.

Manuel de Portillo y Urrizola was replaced in 1762 by Tomás Vélez Cachupín as governor of Santa Fe de Nuevo México province.

See also

List of Spanish governors of New Mexico

References

External links
 Carta de Manuel Portillo de Urrizola—  letter of Carta de Manuel Portillo de Urrizola)

Colonial governors of Santa Fe de Nuevo México
1760s in New Mexico